Sohra Darab Adaryan (also Romanized as Şoḩrā Darab Ādaryān) is a village in Marbin-e Vosta Rural District, in the Central District of Khomeyni Shahr County, Isfahan Province, Iran. At the 2006 census, its population was 10, in 2 families.

References 

Populated places in Khomeyni Shahr County